This is a list of software used to simulate the material and energy balances of chemical process plants. Applications for this include design studies, engineering studies, design audits, debottlenecking studies, control system check-out, process simulation, dynamic simulation, operator training simulators, pipeline management systems, production management systems, digital twins.

See also 
 Chemical engineering
 Process simulation
 Process engineering

References 

 Seader, J.D., Seider, W.D. and Pauls, A.C.: Flowtran Simulation – An Introduction, 2nd Edition, CACHE (1977).
 Douglas, J.M.: Conceptual Design of Chemical Processes, McGraw-Hill, NY, USA (1988).
 Smith, R., Chemical process Design and Integration, Wiley, Chichester, UK (2005).
 Seider, W.D., Seader, J.D., Lewin, D.R. and Widagdo, S. Product and Process Design Principles: Synthesis, Analysis and Design, 3rd Ed., Wiley, Hoboken, NJ, USA (2015)

Chemical engineering software
Chemical Process Simulators